"I Know Enough (I Don't Get Enough)" is a song by Theaudience from their self-titled debut album, Theaudience. It was released as the fourth and final single from the album on 27 July 1998. It reached number 25 on the UK Singles Chart.

B-sides for the single include the album track "Harry, Don't Fetch the Water"; a cover of The Experimental Pop Band's song "Boutique in My Backyard"; a dance track called "The Last Seven Minutes With You"; a short atmospheric instrumental, "Magna Carta vs. Matthew Arnold"; and two remixes by PMFF.

Critical reception
The song garnered a positive response from Select magazine, whose review of the single in August 1998 stated;
'I Know Enough...' is clearly theaudience's best single to date – no mean achievement. It stretches understated, poetic lustings over The Smiths and The Pretenders at their most lithesomely jangling. Like Catatonia, this is dignified mainstream guitar pop at its finest. Double A-side 'Harry, Don't Fetch The Water' is as splendidly obtuse as its title.

Track listing
 UK CD single #1 (AUDCD4)
 "I Know Enough (I Don't Get Enough)" – 3:19
 "Harry, Don't Fetch the Water" – 4:18
 "I Know Enough (I Don't Get Enough)" (PMFF Lite Went Down to 'Frisco Just for the Disco Mix) – 7:10

 UK CD single #2 (AUDDD4)
 "I Know Enough (I Don't Get Enough)" – 3:19
 "Boutique in My Backyard" – 3:35
 "The Last Seven Minutes With You" – 6:10

 UK Limited Edition 7" Vinyl (AUDSV4)
 "I Know Enough (I Don't Get Enough)" – 3:19
 "Harry, Don't Fetch the Water" – 4:18
 "Magna Carta Vs. Matthew Arnold" – 1:33

 UK Limited Edition 12" Vinyl (AUDMV4)
 "I Know Enough (I Don't Get Enough)" (PMFF Lite Went Down to 'Frisco Just for the Disco Mix) – 7:10
 "I Know Enough (I Don't Get Enough)" (PMFF Instrumental) – 6:33

References

1998 singles
Theaudience songs
Mercury Records singles
Songs written by Billy Reeves